Klemen Čebulj (born 21 February 1992) is a Slovenian volleyball player who plays for Asseco Resovia and the Slovenian national team. With Slovenia, he was the runner-up of the European Volleyball Championship three times, in 2015, 2019 and 2021.

Career

National team
On 14 August 2015, Slovenia, including Čebulj, won a gold medal in the 2015 European League. With Slovenia, he was also a runner-up of the 2015 European Championship (lost 3–0 against France in the final).

Honours

Club
 National championships
 2011–12  Slovenian Championship, with ACH Volley
 2016–17  Italian Championship, with Cucine Lube Civitanova
 2018–19  Chinese Championship, with Shanghai Golden Age

Individual awards
 2015: European League – Best Outside Spiker

References

External links

 
 Player profile at LegaVolley.it 
 Player profile at PlusLiga.pl 
 Player profile at Volleybox.net 

1992 births
Living people
Sportspeople from Slovenj Gradec
Slovenian men's volleyball players
Mediterranean Games medalists in volleyball
Mediterranean Games bronze medalists for Slovenia
Competitors at the 2009 Mediterranean Games
Slovenian expatriate sportspeople in Italy
Expatriate volleyball players in Italy
Slovenian expatriate sportspeople in China
Expatriate volleyball players in China
Slovenian expatriate sportspeople in Poland
Expatriate volleyball players in Poland
Resovia (volleyball) players
Outside hitters